The Zodiac Sessions is the first compilation album by American doom metal band Orchid. It compiles remastered versions of both releases on their first record label, the Church Within: their first studio album, Capricorn, and their debut EP, Through the Devil's Doorway. The album was released on 18 November 2013 as a limited edition digipak, with new cover art by singer Theo Mindell.

To accompany the release of The Zodiac Sessions, vinyl versions of Through the Devil's Doorway and Capricorn were separately released.

Track listing

Personnel
Theo Mindell – vocals
Mark Thomas Baker – guitar
Keith Nickel – bass guitar
Carter Kennedy – drums

References

Nuclear Blast compilation albums
2013 compilation albums
Doom metal compilation albums
Compilation albums by American artists
Orchid (heavy metal band) albums